HMS Superb was a nuclear-powered fleet submarine of the  serving in the Royal Navy.

HMS Superb was built by Vickers Shipbuilding Group, now a division of BAE Systems Submarine Solutions. Superb was launched on 30 November 1974 at Barrow-in-Furness, Cumbria and commissioned into the Royal Navy on 13 November 1976. After being damaged in May 2008 in the Red Sea, she returned to HMNB Devonport where she was decommissioned slightly ahead of schedule on 26 September 2008.

Operations
She was the first British submarine to visit the Arctic Ocean and sail under the polar ice caps.

During the Falklands War, Superb was spotted sailing from Gibraltar, which prompted press speculation that she was sailing to the South Atlantic to enforce a maritime exclusion zone. In fact, only  was sailing south at that time but the speculation was useful to promote the apparent threat of the Royal Navy in the South Atlantic and was not corrected by the Navy or Ministry of Defence.

Superb operated in the Indian Ocean in 2001, in support of Operation Veritas, part of the War in Afghanistan.

In January 2008 a sentry was found sleeping while on watch; the reprimand to the crew was caught on video.

2008 underwater pinnacle collision
She remained watertight, and none of the 112 crew were injured; however, she was unable to re-submerge due to damage to her sonar. After undertaking initial repairs at the Souda Bay NATO base on Crete on 10 June 2008, she passed through the Mediterranean Sea, with a pause (at night) some miles off Gibraltar to disembark some less critical crew. Superb then continued back to the UK, arriving at Devonport Dockyard on 28 June 2008. After surveying the damage, the Royal Navy decided to decommission Superb slightly ahead of schedule on 26 September 2008.

Nearly two years after the grounding, Superbs commanding officer at the time of the accident and two other officers were reprimanded for their roles in the collision. All three pleaded guilty to the charges of neglecting to perform their duty in failing to notice that the submarine was travelling towards the pinnacle.  Despite the incident, all three officers were still serving in the Royal Navy at the time of the court-martial.

See also 
 Major submarine incidents since 2000
 2005 USS San Francisco (SSN-711) seamount collision
 2021 USS Connecticut (SSN-22) seamount collision

References

 

Swiftsure-class submarines
Ships built in Barrow-in-Furness
1974 ships